Events in the year 1976 in Turkey.

Parliament
 15th Parliament of Turkey

Incumbents
President – Fahri Korutürk
Prime Minister – Süleyman Demirel 
Leader of the opposition – Bülent Ecevit

Ruling party and the main opposition
Ruling party – Justice Party (AP)   and coalition partners
Main opposition – Republican People's Party (CHP)

Cabinet
39th government of Turkey (also called first MC)

Events
 4 January – Replica of Trojan Horse installed in Troy, Çanakkale
 28 March – Turkey and United States sign a defense agreement.
 30 April – The Seyrani Monument is inaugurated in Develi.
 12 May – Islamic Conference opens.
 30 May – Trabzonspor wins the championship.
 30 July – Research vessel RV MTA Sismik 1 in Aegean Sea
 19 September – Turkish Airlines Flight 452 crashes near Isparta
 24 November – Çaldıran–Muradiye earthquake in East Anatolia

Births
1 January – Mustafa Doğan, Turkish-German footballer and sportscaster
15 January – Zara, singer
16 March – Nurgül Yeşilçay, actress
6 June – Hamza Yerlikaya, Olympic medalist wrestler
2 July – Derya Büyükuncu, swimmer
17 October – Nil Karaibrahimgil, singer

Deaths
5 January – Hamit Kaplan Olympic medalist wrestler
4 February – Kuzgun Acar, Sculptor.
24 March – Şevket Süreyya Aydemir,  economist and author
20 September –  Nazim Terzioglu, mathematician

Gallery

See also
1975–76 1.Lig
List of Turkish films of 1976
Turkey at the 1976 Summer Olympics
Turkey at the 1976 Winter Olympics

References

 
Years of the 20th century in Turkey
1976 in Europe
1976 in Asia
Turkey